This is the discography of the Taiwanese singer-songwriter Jay Chou.

Albums

Studio albums

Live albums

Video albums

Soundtrack albums

Extended plays

Singles

Promotional songs

Collaborations

Vocals
 2010 – "你是我的OK繃" (You're My Bandaid) from The Drifters by The Drifters feat. Jay Chou

Compositions
Songs composed by Chou for other artists
 1999 – "蝸牛" (Snail) by Valen Hsu, Chyi Chin, Panda Hsiung, and Power Station
 2001 – "你怎麼連話都說不清楚" (Can't Speak Clearly) from Lucky Number by Jolin Tsai
 2002 – "熱帶雨林" (Tropical Rainforest) from Youth Society by S.H.E
 2003 – "騎士精神" (Spirit of the Knight) from Magic by Jolin Tsai
 2003 – "說愛你" (Say Love You) from Magic by Jolin Tsai
 2003 – "布拉格廣場" (Prague Square) from Magic by Jolin Tsai
 2004 – "就是愛" (It's Love) from Castle by Jolin Tsai
 2004 – "倒帶" (Rewind) from Castle by Jolin Tsai
 2004 – "海盜" (Pirates) from Castle by Jolin Tsai
 2004 – "候鳥" (Migratory Bird) from Encore by S.H.E
 2005 – "自我催眠" (Self-Hypnosis) from Hypnosis Show by Show Lo
 2006 - ""失憶" (Amnesia) from Kissing the Future of Love by Fish Leong
 2006 – "觸電" (Electric Shock) from Forever by S.H.E
 2007 - "淘汰" (Elimination) from Admit it by Eason Chan
 2007 – "我不是F4" (I'm Not F4) from I'm Not F4 by Vic Chou
 2007 - "小小" (Little Little) from Little Little by Joey Yung
 2010 – "想你就寫信" (If I Think of You I'll Write You a Letter) from The Drifters by The Drifters
 2011 – "幸福微甜" (Love Is Sweet) from Perfection by Super Junior–M
 2012 – "都要微笑好嗎" (Keep Smiling) from First Time OST by Angelababy
2018 – "謝謝一輩子" (Thank you for a lifetime) by Jackie Chan
2018 - "一路上小心" by Jacky Wu
2020 - "等風雨經過" (Waiting for the Wind and Rain to Pass) by Jacky Cheung

Music videos
Music videos directed by Chou for other artists
 2004 – "家" (Home) from Nan Quan Mama's Summer by Nan Quan Mama
 2005 – "不作你的朋友" (Not Gonna Be Your Friend) from Once Upon a Time by S.H.E
 2010 – "你是我的OK繃" (You're My Bandaid) from The Drifters by The Drifters

Notes

References

External links
  Jay Chou@JVR Music

Discography
Discographies of Taiwanese artists
Mandopop discographies